The first USS Theodore Roosevelt (ID-1478) was a United States Navy troop transport in commission from 1918 to 1919.

Construction, acquisition, and commissioning

SS Theodore Roosevelt was a passenger steamer built in 1906 at Toledo, Ohio, by the Toledo Shipbuilding Company, and operated commercially on Lake Michigan. Ordered taken over by the U.S. Navy on 6 April 1918 for World War I service as a troop transport, she was acquired by the United States Navy from the Roosevelt Steamship Company sometime in the spring of 1918, assigned Identification Number (Id. No.) 1478, and fitted out as a troop transport during the summer and fall of 1918. Though some sources suggest that Theodore Roosevelt served in a non-commissioned capacity in the Navy, the fact that the 1919 Navy Directory lists Lieutenant Harry D. Irwin, USNRF, as "...comdg U.S.S. Roosevelt..." is a strong indication that she was in fact commissioned as USS Theodore Roosevelt (ID-1478) during 1918.

Operations
By 1 November 1918, Theodore Roosevelt was assigned to duty as a transport carrying troops back and forth across the English Channel between the United Kingdom and France. She continued that duty at least until 1 April 1919 and probably returned to the United States sometime in April or May.

Decommissioning and disposal
As of 1 June 1919, Theodore Roosevelt was at New York awaiting disposition. On 1 July 1919, she was sold to the Cleveland Steamship Company and her name was struck from the Naval Vessel Register the same day.

Later career

Once again SS Theodore Roosevelt, she resumed her commercial career as a passenger ship on the Great Lakes, operating on Lake Erie. In 1926, she was sold to the Maritime Securities Company of Manitowoc, Wisconsin, and underwent modifications. In 1927, she was sold to the Chicago Roosevelt Steamship Company of Duluth, Minnesota. As a result of either the 1926 or 1927 sale, she moved back to Lake Michigan. Later in her career she also operated in the Detroit, Michigan, area, and perhaps elsewhere in the Great Lakes. She was sold again to T.J. McGuire of Duluth,

Theodore Roosevelt appears to have been laid up sometime around 1945. She was sold in 1946 to the Cleveland and Cedar Point Steamship Company of Duluth, then again in 1947 to the Cleveland and Buffalo Steamship Company of Cleveland. She finally was sold for scrapping in 1950 to the Cream City Lumber and Wrecking Company of Milwaukee, Wisconsin.

Notes

References

 
Department of the Navy Navy History and Heritage Command Online Library of Selected Images: Civilian Ships: Theodore Roosevelt (American Great Lakes Passenger Steamship, 1906). Served as USS Theodore Roosevelt (ID # 1478) in 1918–1919
NavSource Online: Section Patrol Craft Photo Archive: Theodore Roosevelt (ID 1478)

Ships built in Toledo, Ohio
Great Lakes ships
Transports of the United States Navy
World War I transports of the United States
1906 ships
Ships built by the Toledo Shipbuilding Company